The Duchy of Oels or Duchy of Oleśnica was one of the duchies of Silesia with its capital in Oleśnica in Lower Silesia, Poland. Initially ruled by the Silesian Piasts, it was acquired by the Münsterberg (Ziębice) dukes of the Podiebrad family from 1495 and was inherited by the House of Württemberg in 1649. Conquered by Prussia in 1742, it was enfeoffed to the Welf dukes of Brunswick-Lüneburg from 1792 until its dissolution in 1884.

History

Initially part of the Piast Duchy of Silesia, the Oleśnica area became part of the Duchy of Głogów in 1294, following an armed conflict between Duke Henry III of Głogów and his cousin Henry V the Fat, Duke of Wrocław. After the death of Duke Henry III in 1309, it gained significant autonomy during the division of the Głogów lands and the creation of the Duchy of Oleśnica for Henry's son Bolesław in 1313, succeeded by his brother Konrad I in 1321.

Konrad sought protection from the inheritance claims raised by his Piast cousins and King Władysław I the Elbow-high of Poland at the Bohemian crown and in 1329 swore allegiance to the Luxembourg king John of Bohemia. On good terms with King John and his son Emperor Charles IV, Duke Konrad I was able to acquire the Koźle area upon the death of Duke Bolesław of Bytom in 1355. His son Duke Konrad II the Gray further purchased the town of Kąty and half of the Duchy of Ścinawa from Duke Henry VIII the Sparrow. He bequested considerable possessions to his successor Konrad III the Old in 1403.

Oleśnica remained a Bohemian fief, which from 1413 was ruled by the sons of Duke Konrad III. While Konrad IV the Older acquired the title of a Duke of Bernstadt (Bierutów) and became Bishop of Wrocław in 1417, while his younger brothers Konrad V Kantner and Konrad VII the White in 1437 reached their renewed enfeoffment by Emperor Sigismund. The sons of Konrad V, Konrad IX the Black and Konrad X the White assumed the rule in 1450 and again paid homage to the Bohemian king George of Poděbrady. Thus, after the local branch of the Silesian Piasts had died out with the death of Duke Konrad X in 1492, Duke Henry of Münsterberg, son of the predeceased Bohemian King George of Poděbrady, claimed the ceased fief for him and his descendants. His claims were finally acknowledged by George's successor King Vladislav II Jagellonský in 1495, after the state countries Syców (Groß Wartenberg), Żmigród (Trachenberg), and Milicz (Militsch) had been split off.

When the Poděbrad dynasty became extinct in 1647, the Habsburg emperor Ferdinand III, King of Bohemia, enfeoffed Silvius I Nimrod of Württemberg with Oleśnica, who had married the daughter of the last Podiěbrad duke. The duchy remained under the Crown of Bohemia until in 1742 it was conquered by the Kingdom of Prussia in the course of the Silesian Wars.

The Württemberg dukes remained landowners until in 1792 the duchy was inherited by Frederick Augustus of Brunswick-Lüneburg, son of Charles I, Duke of Brunswick-Wolfenbüttel. From 1815 Oleśnica was ruled in personal union with the Duchy of Brunswick until its dissolution after Duke William had died without issue in 1884.

See also
Dukes of Silesia

Notes

Duchies of Silesia
Podiebrad family
States and territories established in 1313